The Provisional Siberian Government (later the Provisional Government of Autonomous Siberia), was an ephemeral government for Siberia created by the White movement.

History

Background

The seizure of power by the Bolshevik Party in Petrograd in the Russian Revolution of November 1917 was followed by the dispersal of the Russian Constituent Assembly early in the morning of January 19, 1918 (N.S.), a body which had been dominated by the elected representatives of the Party of Socialists-Revolutionaries (PSR), headed by Victor Chernov. This usurpation of authority by the Council of People's Commissars and the 2nd All-Russian Congress of Soviets did not spell the end of opposition to the Bolshevik regime, however.

In December 1917 elections were held to select a Siberian Regional Duma which was to be convened in the city of Tomsk. Owing to the revolutionary temper of the times, the middle class and the bourgeoisie had been excluded from the elections to this body, a decision which was hotly denounced by the centrist Constitutional Democratic Party (known as the K-D, or Kadets).   Additionally the Bolsheviks saw the Siberian effort as a thinly-veiled attempt to undermine the national sovereignty of their fledgling regime and refused to participate in the elections to this Siberian Regional Duma or to recognize the body's legitimacy. With the Monarchist Right thus excluded, the Center undermined, and the Bolshevik Left boycotting, it was unsurprising that delegates elected to this Siberian regional parliament were dominated by members of Chernov's PSR.

After a delay necessitated by the inability to assemble a quorum of elected representatives, on the night of January 28/29, 1918, some forty delegates finally succeeded in gathering in Tomsk to conduct their business. This body expeditiously elected a government known as the Provisional Siberian Government (PSG), under the chairmanship of a young Socialist-Revolutionary Piotr Derber. Of the PSG's twenty ministers, only six had been present at the founding meeting of January 28–29. Two had been in Bolshevik prison, and the rest were scattered throughout Siberia and north China and were chosen in
absentia, without their prior consent. Some of them, including Derber, quickly fled to the Far East; others went into hiding.

On 1 June 1918, after the Revolt of the Czechoslovak Legion, the formation of the West Siberian Commissariat was announced. According to William Henry Chamberlin, "It derived its claim to authority from the Government, headed by a Socialist Revolutionary named Derber, which had been elected in February by the Siberian Regional Duma, a body which had been chosen on the basis of universal suffrage and which, like the Constituent Assembly, had been dispersed by the Bolsheviki."

Derber didn't agree with this result and his PSG on the meeting at Vladivostok was renamed as Provisional Government of Autonomous Siberia (PGAS). PGAS and new PSG didn't recognize each other and claimed themselves as the only government of Siberia, but Derber's government didn't have armed forces. In a short time, Derber resigned and left Vladivostok; his successor was I.A.Lavrov from Socialist-Revolutionary Party. 

In September 1918, the Pyotr Vologodsky, representing the Provisional All-Russian Government, traveled to Eastern Siberia according to Chamberlin, "...and obtained the abdication of the phantom Derber Cabinet in Vladivostok."

Footnotes

Other sources consulted

 The Russian Civil War by Evan Mawdsley (2008) Edinburgh, Birlinn pp 143–8
 Kommersant: Primorye (Maritime) Territory

States and territories established in 1918
History of Siberia
1918 disestablishments in Asia
Siberian Government (Vladivostok)
Siberian Government (Vladivostok)
Provisional governments of the Russian Civil War